Gelon also known as Gelo (Greek: Γέλων Gelon, gen.: Γέλωνος; died 478 BC), son of Deinomenes, was a Greek tyrant of the Sicilian cities Gela and Syracuse, and first of the Deinomenid rulers.

Early life 
Gelon was the son of Deinomenes. According to Herodotus, Gelon's ancestors came from the island of Telos in the Aegean Sea and were the founders of the city of Gela in southern Sicily. One of his later ancestors, Telines, was said to have reconciled his people after a period of civil strife through the divine rites of the Earth Goddesses; Herodotus infers that all of Telines' descendants, including Gelon, were priests of this cult.

Gelon's three brothers were Hieron, Thrasybulus and Polyzalos. Deinomenes consulted an oracle about the fates of his children, and was told that Gelon, Hieron and Thrasybulus were all destined to become tyrants.

Gelon fought in a number of the conflicts between the various tyrant kings of Sicily and earned a reputation as a formidable soldier. His performance was so impressive that he was promoted to be commander of the cavalry for his uncle Hippocrates, tyrant of Gela. From this position he played a key role in a number of battles, including one against Syracuse, a city which he himself would later conquer.

Rise to power 
But it was not until Hippocrates was killed in a battle with the native Sicel tribe of Sicily at Hybla that Gelon's rise to power began. Upon Hippocrates' death his sons retained the throne, but the common people were tired of this family's rule and revolted. Gelon quelled the revolt on the pretext of helping Hippocrates' sons gain power. Instead, he took power for himself with the help of the army in 491 BC. The territory now under his control as tyrant included that of Gela, Naxos in the east, Zancle in the northeast, and Camarina in the south.

Tyrant of Syracuse 
Gelon ruled over Gela and his other territories in eastern Sicily peacefully for the next five years. In 485 BC, the aristocracy of Syracuse called the Gamori, who had been forced out of the city by the common people, came to Gelon seeking his aid. Seeing an opportunity for expansion, Gelon used his now large military force to capture the city of Syracuse with little or no resistance, reinstating the exiled Gamori.

Gelon now ruled as the new tyrant of Syracuse and left his brother Hiero to rule over Gela. According to Herodotus, he forced half the citizens of Gela to move to Syracuse. Similarly, he removed all the aristocracy from Camarina.

He continued this strategy as he conquered nearby Euboea and Megara Hyblaea (483 BC), forcibly removing the aristocracy from each city and placing the rest of the population in slavery. According to Herodotus, because he was raised as a noble and was constantly in the presence of nobility, Gelon did not care for the lower class, and "found the common people unpleasant to share a house with".

Under Gelon's rule, Syracuse soon became prosperous. Along with grand building program in Syracuse, Gelon sought also to create a powerful mercenary army. Most of the recruits for his army came from the native Sicel tribes. However, some were recruited from the Greek mainland, men who had most likely fought with Gelon at some point in the past, and their total number was said to be around 10,000. All of these men were granted citizenship of Syracuse.

Gelon found a powerful ally in Theron, tyrant of Acragas, a city west of Gela, after he married Theron's daughter, Demareta. In 481 BC representatives of Athens came to him asking for his aid in the upcoming war against Xerxes I and his Persian army. Gelon replied that he could supply 28,000 men as well as 200 ships if he was appointed commander of either the Greek navy or army. He was denied both positions and, therefore, refused to supply the Greeks with any supplies or men. In fact, he went so far as to prepare gifts for Xerxes in case the Persian king won his war against the Greek alliance.

Among Gelon's forces offered to the Athenians there was a large proportion of cavalry and light troops, including archers and slingers, which suggests military science had achieved a higher level under Gelon than in Athens and Sparta.

Battle of Himera 

His unwillingness to support the Greeks could have been related to the threat posed by the Carthaginians on the west coast of Sicily. Theron of Acragas had jeopardized the independence of all of Sicily from the powerful Carthaginians when he defeated the tyrant Terillus at Himera. Seeking a powerful ally to assist in recapturing Himera, Terillus went to Carthage for assistance. The Carthaginians were happy to respond to his plea. The Carthaginians were keen to increase their influence and territory in Sicily and the opportunity came at a perfect time because of the coming Persian invasion of Greece.

Some scholars argue that Xerxes and the Carthaginians were in contact with each other and coordinated a simultaneous attack on both the western and eastern fronts of Greece and its colonies, in the hopes that it would prevent either front from aiding the other. In any case, in 480 BC a Carthaginian force of 300,000 men landed at Panormus on the north coast of Sicily and advanced east towards Himera, led by their general Hamilcar. Gelon, upon hearing the danger his ally Theron was in, led an army of 50,000 men and 5,000 cavalry to Himera.

A contingent of Gelon's men gained access to the Carthaginian camp by posing as allies from the nearby city of Selinus. Once inside they signalled to the rest of Gelon's troops, who were stationed in the mountains overlooking the camp, by setting fire to Hamilcar's ships. The ensuing battle was a decisive victory for Gelon and Theron, with Carthaginian casualties estimated at 150,000, including Hamilcar.

The riches collected from the Carthaginian camp, as well as the 2,000 talents of silver that resulted from the peace treaty with Carthage, were dispersed by Gelon among his troops and his allies, with a large amount designated for the construction of a new temple in Syracuse. According to Herodotus, upon his return to his capital, Gelon organized a meeting with the people of Syracuse, and described to them his actions during the war with Hamilcar, and the manner in which he dispersed the spoils. He told them that if they found anything wrong in his conduct, they were free to kill him and take control of Syracuse for themselves. The people of Syracuse decided to keep Gelon as their tyrant, and he continued his reign in peace for the next two years.

Death and succession
Gelon died in 478 BC after ruling Syracuse for seven years. Control of his kingdom passed to his brother Hieron, who ruled for the next 10 years until his death, when a dispute over to whom the crown should pass led to the dissolution of the Syracusan state.

Analysis of contribution to Sicily and Greek history 
Gelon's first major contribution to Greek, and more specifically Sicilian, history was the foundation of Syracuse as his capital, which he turned into "the greatest Greek city in the west." The location of the city itself made it a prime spot for such a role. The city was located on an island, connected to the mainland by a peninsula constructed in the 6th century BC. The city faced east towards the Greek mainland and had its own harbour.

Gelon constructed a wall that ran from the fort of Achradina on the mainland to the sea, making Syracuse virtually impregnable. Also, by bringing in the wealthy citizens from conquered cities, a tactic never before used in Sicily, he greatly increased the prosperity of the city. He constructed a theatre which improved the city's culture, and following the victory at Himera, he built an ornate temple dedicated to the goddess Athena. All of these improvements influenced the history of Syracuse for many years. The city was an important outpost for both the Roman and Byzantine empires, and today is a location of great historical importance for Sicily and Italy.

The other great contribution of Gelon was the victory at Himera over the Carthaginians. The battle was significant because of the timing and location of the event. There is little doubt that if Hamilcar had managed to defeat the large Sicilian force of Gelon and Theron, he could have conquered the entire island of Sicily if he so wished. The Greek states on the mainland would have been unable to send troops due to their own war with the Persians. If, as many historians believe, the Persian and Carthaginian armies were in contact with each other, a defeat at Himera for Gelon could have led to a two pronged attack on the Greek mainland by the Persian and the Carthaginians, and perhaps to the eventual demise of Greek civilisation. But by defeating Hamilcar in 480 BC, Gelon managed to keep Sicily free from Carthaginian invasion for the next seventy years.

Gelon seems to have been highly regarded by his subjects at least partially due to his victory at the Battle of Himera. This respect is apparent from the elaborate tomb and statue built in his memory at public expense.

Despite Gelon's mistreatment of conquered people, his reputation as a respected tyrant and generous king survived the passage of time. Perhaps the greatest testament to his influence over Sicily is how his statue was spared as Timoleon tried to erase all memory of the reign of tyrants when Sicily became a democracy 150 years after Gelon's death.

References

Sources
 
 
 Bury, John B. History of Greece to the Death of Alexander the Great. Macmillan, 1922. 298-303.
 Freeman, Edward A. The History of Sicily from the Earliest Times : From the beginning of Greek settlement to the beginning of Athenian intervention. Vol. 2. At the Clarendon P, 1891. 122-33.
 "Gelon." Encyclopædia Britannica. 2008. Encyclopædia Britannica Online School Edition. 4 December 2008 <http://school.eb.com/eb/article-9036333>.
 Hart, John. Herodotus and Greek History. Taylor & Francis, 1982. 62.
 Munn, Mark H. The Mother of the Gods, Athens, and the Tyranny of Asia : A Study of Sovereignty in Ancient Religion. New York: University of California P, 2006. 91-92.
 Oman, Charles. A History of Greece from the Earliest Times to the Death of Alexander the Great. Longmans, Green, and Co., 1901. 232-34.
 Rollin, Charles. The Ancient History of the Egyptians, Carthaginians, Assyrians, Babylonians, Medes and Persians, Macedonians and Grecians. Vol. 2. J.B. Lippincott & Co., 1869. 171-73.
 Smith, William. A Dictionary of Greek and Roman Biography and Mythology : Earinus-Nyx. Vol. 2. J. Murray, 1876. 236-37.
 Thirlwall, Connop. A History of Greece. Vol. 1. New York, NY: Harper and Brothers, 1860. 225.

External links 
 

|width=25% align=center|Preceded by:Hippocrates
|width=25% align=center|Tyrant of Gela491 BC485 BC
|width=25% align=center|Succeeded by:Hieron I
|-
|width=25% align=center|Preceded by:-
|width=25% align=center|Tyrant of Syracuse485 BC478 BC
|width=25% align=center|Succeeded by:Hieron I
|-

478 BC deaths
5th-century BC Greek people
Sicilian Greeks
Ancient Greek generals
6th-century BC monarchs
Sicilian tyrants
Ancient Geloans
Year of birth unknown
People of the Sicilian Wars